Joseph Bato (1888–1966) was a Hungarian artist. He fled Germany following the Nazi takeover due to his Jewish heritage and settled in London where he was employed as an art director and costume designer in the British film industry. He worked for London Films on a number of productions including the 1949 film The Third Man.

Selected filmography
 Bonnie Prince Charlie (1948)
 The Third Man  (1949)
 The Elusive Pimpernel (1950)
 The Happiest Days of Your Life (1950)
 Lady Godiva Rides Again (1951)
 The Wonder Kid (1952)
 The Sound Barrier (1952)
 The Story of Gilbert and Sullivan (1953)
 The Intruder (1953)
 The Heart of the Matter (1953)
 The Belles of St. Trinian's (1954)
 An Inspector Calls (1954)
 The Deep Blue Sea (1955)
 Raising a Riot (1955)
 They Can't Hang Me (1956)
 Blue Murder at St. Trinian's (1957)
 The Diplomatic Corpse (1958)

References

Bibliography
 Evans, Peter William. Carol Reed. Manchester University Press,  2005.
 Phillips, Gene. Beyond the Epic: The Life and Films of David Lean. University Press of Kentucky, 2006.

External links

1888 births
1966 deaths
Hungarian Jews
People from Budapest
Hungarian art directors
British art directors
British costume designers
Hungarian costume designers
Hungarian emigrants to the United Kingdom
People who emigrated to escape Nazism